Headin' North is a 1930 American pre-Code Western film written and directed by John P. McCarthy.

Cast 
Bob Steele as Jim Curtis
Barbara Luddy as Mary Jackson
Perry Murdock as "Snicker" Kimball
Walter Shumway as Arnold/Stanton
Eddie Dunn as the announcer
Fred Burns as U. S. marshal
Gordon De Main as Foreman
Harry Allen
Gunnis Davis as Smith & Smith
S. S. Simon as the palace owner
Jim Welsh as the Old Actor
Jack Henderson as Drunk

See also 
Bob Steele filmography

References

External links 

1930 films
1930 Western (genre) films
American black-and-white films
American Western (genre) films
1930s English-language films
Films directed by John P. McCarthy
1930s American films